Scooby-Doo's Haunted Mansion is a Scooby-Doo-themed interactive dark ride series created by Sally Corporation based on Hanna-Barbera's long-running animated television series. The ride transports guests in a vehicle equipped with light guns that are used to shoot at various targets to collect points throughout the ride. At its peak, the ride model was located at seven amusement parks around the world including Canada's Wonderland, the location of the first installation that debuted in 2000. Initially known under a variety of names, the ride's Scooby-Doo theme has been replaced by Boo Blasters on Boo Hill at several locations and removed from others. The last remaining installation is La Aventura de Scooby-Doo at Parque Warner Madrid in Madrid, Spain.

History
In the late 1990s, Paramount Parks-owned Canada's Wonderland collaborated with Sally Corporation to develop Scooby-Doo's Haunted Mansion. The ride opened to the public on May 7, 2000. In November that year, the ride was recognized as the Best New Children's Ride. Similar versions of ride were added to three other Paramount Park locations over the next few years.

In 2002, Six Flags bought into the ride concept installing it at two locations, Six Flags Fiesta Texas and Six Flags St. Louis, with the latter using an existing water ride system. On June 16, 2005, Parque Warner Madrid (while it was operated by Six Flags) also added an installation as well featuring a trackless ride system manufactured by ETF Ride Systems. The ride was opened by José Corbacho and El Terrat.

Following Cedar Fair's acquisition of Paramount Parks, the Scooby-Doo dark rides at its properties were re-themed prior to the 2010 season. The move was part of the company's objective to remove the Hanna-Barbera brand from all of its parks. Sally Corporation assisted with creating a new theme that became known as Boo Blasters on Boo Hill. The makeover left the interactive shooting aspect intact, while the Hanna-Barbera characters were replaced in favor of ghost-like creatures.

During the 2014 season, Six Flags St. Louis put up a sign at the attraction that read, "Scooby-Doo Ghostblasters: The Mystery of the Scary Swamp will close permanently, September 14, 2014 for future improvements". It was later announced that it would be replaced by Justice League: Battle for Metropolis. In late 2017, Six Flags Fiesta Texas announced that their installation of the ride would close permanently on January 7, 2018. Its replacement Pirates of the Deep Sea opened to the public on January 12, 2019.

Locations

Ride experience

The ride is a dark ride experience for families which involves shooting laser guns at ghosts and ghouls infesting Ghastley Manor (known as Ghastly Manor on the ride's entrance). Riders in consecutive Mystery Machine-themed cars compete with each other to see who can shoot the most ghosts. Riders also shoot at Scooby Snacks, triggering appearances from Scooby-Doo. Also infesting Ghastley Manor is the Phantom Shadow, who at the end of the ride is caught by Scooby and Shaggy Rogers (who covers his eyes in fear) and revealed to be a counterfeiter named Dr. D.M. Ghastley, the owner of Ghastley Manor, who was illegally printing money in the dungeon of Ghastley Manor, and dressed up as the Phantom Shadow to scare away any trespassers. The riders then enter the garage, where Ghastley isn't sent to jail as a skeleton is driving the police van with the cop trapped in a box. The Scooby-Doo theme was licensed from Hanna-Barbera by the ride's creators, Sally Corporation. The riders come across a gigantic pipe organ, where in the Canada's Wonderland version, a rendition of the classical the piece "Fantasia in G Minor BWV 542" by J.S. Bach can be heard.

The installation at Six Flags St. Louis differed from the rest as it relied upon a water ride system. It was therefore themed to a journey through a swamp. It featured different monsters from the Scooby-Doo series as well as the Mystery Inc. gang popping out of trees and shrubs.

The outsides of the show buildings are decorated with a fiberglass blue and purple castle with stylized turrets. Two circular windows resemble eyes while the entrance to the castle resembles a mouth. Guests entered the attraction by passing under a Gothic-style arch bearing the rides name, and that was adorned on either side by the letters "GM," standing for Ghastley Manor.

Voices
Scott Innes as Scooby-Doo and Shaggy Rogers
David García Vázquez as Scooby-Doo (Spanish)
Juan Logar Jr. as Shaggy Rogers (Spanish)

Awards
 IAAPA Best New Children's Ride (2000)
UETPA Best Family Attraction (2005)

Gallery

See also
 Ghost Blasters

References

External links
 Information at Sally Corporation website

Scooby-Doo in amusement parks
Amusement rides manufactured by Sally Corporation
Animatronic attractions
Dark rides
Cedar Fair attractions
Six Flags attractions
Sally Corporation animatronics
2002 establishments in Texas
2018 disestablishments in Texas
Warner Bros. Global Brands and Experiences attractions
Hanna-Barbera in amusement parks